Cherry Hill may refer to:

Places

Canada
 Cherry Hill, Nova Scotia, a community

United Kingdom
 Cherry Hill, Virginia Water, Surrey, England, a listed house

United States
(by state)
Cherry Hill, Perry County, Arkansas, an unincorporated community
Cherry Hill, Polk County, Arkansas, an unincorporated community
 Cherry Hill, Baltimore, Maryland, a neighborhood
 Cherry Hill, Cecil County, Maryland, a village
 Cherry Hill, Michigan, an unincorporated community
 Cherry Hill, New Jersey, a township
 Cherry Hill, Bergen County, New Jersey, now known as New Bridge Landing
 Cherry Hill (Albany, New York), a historic house listed on the NRHP
 Cherry Hill, New York, a hamlet in the town of Harmony
 Cherry Hill (Falls Church, Virginia), a farmhouse listed on the NRHP in Virginia
 Cherry Hill, Prince William County, Virginia, a census-designated place
 Cherry Hill, Roanoke, Virginia, a neighborhood
 Cherry Hill, Seattle, Washington, a neighborhood
 Cherry Hill Farm, location near Albany, New York, site of the Murder at Cherry Hill
 Cherry Hill Historic District, Canton Township, listed on the National Register of Historic Places (NRHP)
 Cherry Hill Mall, a shopping mall
 Cherry Hill Mall, New Jersey, a census-designated place
 Cherry Hill Plantation, historic site in Inez, North Carolina
 Cherryhill Township, Indiana County, Pennsylvania
 Cherry Hills Village, Colorado, a municipality

Schools
 Cherry Hill Public Schools, Cherry Hill, New Jersey
 Cherry Hill High School East
 Cherry Hill High School West
 Cherry Hill Seminary, South Carolina

Sports
 Cherry Hill Arena, Cherry Hill, New Jersey
 Cherry Hill Rookies, a basketball team
 Cherry Hills Country Club, Cherry Hills Village, Colorado

Transportation
 Cherry Hill station (Baltimore Light Rail), Baltimore, Maryland
 Cherry Hill station (NJ Transit), Cherry Hill, New Jersey

Other uses
 Cherry Hill (amusement park) in Kaysville, Utah
 Cherry Hill (Central Park), a fountain in Central Park, New York City
 "Cherry Hill Park", a 1969 song by Billy Joe Royal
 Cherry Hill Gang, a 19th-century gang in New York City

See also 
 Cherry Hill Road (disambiguation)